Donald Edward Gullett (born January 6, 1951) is an American former professional baseball player and coach. He played in Major League Baseball as a left-handed pitcher from  through , most notably as a member of the Cincinnati Reds dynasty that won four National League pennants and two World Series championships between 1970 and 1976. After his playing career, he served as pitching coach for the Cincinnati Reds from 1993 to 2005. In 2002, he was inducted into the Cincinnati Reds Hall of Fame.

High school
Gullett was born in Lynn, Kentucky and attended McKell High School in South Shore, Kentucky, where he was an outstanding three-sports athlete in baseball, football, and basketball. He began to pitch while in eighth grade. As a high school pitcher, he once tossed a perfect game—including striking out 20 of the 21 hitters he faced. Gullett excelled as a high school football player as well once scoring 72 points in a single game. He ran for 11 touchdowns and kicked 6 extra points. He was named all-state in three sports his senior year (baseball, football, basketball). Gullett's legacy is remembered in a monument on the courthouse lawn in Greenup County, Kentucky that declares that "This is Don Gullett Country."

Professional career
The Reds selected Gullett in the first round of the 1969 Major League Baseball draft. He pitched for the Sioux Falls Packers of the Northern League that season. In 1970, Gullett was so impressive in spring training, despite his inexperience, he made the big league roster of a team that would go on to win the NL Pennant. Pitching in relief of starter Ray Washburn, Gullett debuted on April 10, 1970, on the road against the San Francisco Giants. Gullett had an outstanding rookie season, appearing in 44 games (42 in relief) posting a 5-2 record and a 2.43 earned run average. In the 1970 World Series against the Baltimore Orioles, Gullett pitched  innings and allowed just one earned run (1.35 earned run average) as he and veteran Clay Carroll helped keep an injury-riddled pitching staff competitive in the series. During the 1972 season Gullett suffered from hepatitis. That season turned out to be the only one in which he had a losing record.

Gullett was the pitcher when Willie Mays hit the 660th and last home run of his Major League Baseball career on August 17, 1973. Gullett also surrendered Hank Aaron's 660th home run on August 6, 1972.

Gullett played for the Reds through the  season. In November of that year, as a free agent, he signed with the New York Yankees. His fourth start with New York came on a rainy day at Memorial Stadium in Baltimore on April 25. During the fourth inning, Gullett slipped and fell on the wet pitching mound, spraining his ankle and straining a muscle in his neck. The injury required him to wear a neck brace and miss some starts. In his return on May 7, he struck out 10 and threw 154 pitches in a complete game, 11–2 victory over the Oakland Athletics.

During a nine-year career, Gullett accumulated 109 wins and posted a 3.11 earned run average and tallied 921 strikeouts. Playing for only nine seasons, Gullett was a member of six World Series teams (1970, '72, '75, '76, '77, and '78), including four consecutive world champions ('75 and '76 Reds, and '77 and '78 Yankees).

At the plate, Gullett posted a career batting average of .194. In a 1975 National League Championship Series game against the Pittsburgh Pirates, Gullett pitched a complete game and hit a single and home run, collecting 3 runs batted in.

In 1989, Gullett played for the St. Lucie Legends of the Senior Professional Baseball Association.

Personal life 
Gullett married his wife, Cathy, in 1969. The couple are parents of a son and two daughters. Gullett has suffered two heart attacks.

He resides at and owns a farm in his hometown of Lynn in Greenup County, Kentucky. Tobacco was the primary crop grown during the 1970s and 1980s. About 800 Cannabis plants being cultivated on his farmland were discovered by the Kentucky State Police on August 1, 1977. He denied any knowledge of the plants. The farmland's caretaker was his brother Jack who was indicted on a charge of trafficking in a controlled substance the following month on September 30. Red Smith joked, "Gullett, of course, doesn't have to grow his own. With the salary he wangled out of the Yankees as a free agent, he can afford to buy all the joints he needs in the retail market."

Career statistics

References

External links

Don Gullett at Society for American Baseball Research

1951 births
Living people
Baseball players from Kentucky
Cincinnati Reds coaches
Cincinnati Reds players
Major League Baseball pitchers
Major League Baseball pitching coaches
New York Yankees players
People from South Shore, Kentucky
Sioux Falls Packers players
St. Lucie Legends players